Coleophora caraganae is a moth of the family Coleophoridae. It is found in Russia (Ussuri).

The larvae feed on Caragana ussuriensis and Halimodendron halodendron. They feed on the leaves of their host plant.

References

caraganae
Moths described in 1974
Moths of Asia